Slaughtered (working title Schooner of Blood) is an Australian slasher film directed by Kate Glover, and produced by Sue Brown. The film stars Steven O’Donnell and James Kerley.

Premise
The story tells of a bloody masked killer who stalks victims in an isolated country pub.

Cast

Production
The shooting began in February 2007 and was the directorial debut for Kate Glover. Makeup effects were created by FX make-up artist Aline Joyce.

Release
Slaughtered was featured at the United Kingdom festival Film4 Fright and in 2009 at Grimmfest.

References

External links
 

2009 films
2009 horror films
Films set in Australia
Australian slasher films
Australian independent films
2009 directorial debut films
2000s English-language films
2000s slasher films